Huli Hejje is a 1984 Indian Kannada-language film, directed by K. S. L. Swamy (Ravee) and produced by Shashirekha. The film stars Vishnuvardhan, Tiger Prabhakar, Vijayalakshmi Singh and Srigeetha. The film ran successfully for more than 100 days and became a super hit.The film has musical score by Vijaya Bhaskar.

Cast

Vishnuvardhan
Tiger Prabhakar
Vijayalakshmi Singh
Srigeetha
Jai Jagadish
M. V. Vasudeva Rao
Sundar Krishna Urs
Sudheer
Dinesh
Doddanna
Master Ravi
Pramila Joshai
Shashikala
Theresamma
Suman
Chayadevi
Mallika
Shivaprakash
Bhatti Mahadevappa
Ashwath Narayan

Soundtrack
The music was composed by Vijayabhaskar.

References

External links
 
 

1984 films
1980s Kannada-language films
Films scored by Vijaya Bhaskar
Indian action films
Films directed by K. S. L. Swamy
1984 action films